The Underwood United Methodist Church is a church in Aurora County, South Dakota which was built in 1908.  It was added to the National Register of Historic Places in 2008.

Built in 1908, it was modified in 1920.  It is a one-story gable front church with an octagonal bell tower.

References

Methodist churches in South Dakota
Churches on the National Register of Historic Places in South Dakota
Churches completed in 1908
Buildings and structures in Aurora County, South Dakota
National Register of Historic Places in Aurora County, South Dakota
1908 establishments in North Dakota